Trusted by Millions is the seventh album by Canadian rock band 54-40, released in 1996. Certified Platinum in Canada, it sold over 130,000 copies by the end of 1997.

Track listing
All tracks written by Neil Osborne, Brad Merritt, Phil Comparelli and Matt Johnson.

 "Cheer Up Peru" - 3:51
 "Stick to Milly" - 4:05
 "Love You All" - 4:28
 "Crossing a Canyon" - 3:58
 "Hooked on Bliss" - 2:53
 "Couldn't Be Sorry" - 4:30
 "This Is My Haircut" - 3:03
 "Desperately Seeking Anyone" - 3:35
 "Frankl's Revenge" - 4:28
 "I Love Candy" - 3:32
 "Cry a Little" - 7:02
 "Lies to Me" - 3:20

References

1996 albums
54-40 albums